The John Watson's Institution was a school established in Edinburgh, Scotland in 1762.  The building was designed in the Greek Revival style in 1825 by architect William Burn. Following the closure of the school, the building was left vacated for a number of years before becoming home to Modern One of the Scottish National Gallery of Modern Art.

History
In 1762 John Watson, an Edinburgh solicitor and Writer to the Signet, left the residue of his estate for charitable purposes for children in the Edinburgh area. A refuge was established which eventually became John Watson's Institution, commonly known as John Watson's School.

In 1975 the school was closed and in 1984 the organisation was changed by Parliament to the John Watson's Trust in order to distribute funds from the sale of its assets.

The school magazine was known as "The Levite".

Headmasters

John Langhorne (1897–1925)
John Langhorne was born at Tonbridge, Kent in 1862.  He was educated at Westminster School and Trinity College, Cambridge.  His first appointments were Queen Elizabeth's school, Dedham and Christ's College, Finchley.  He moved to Edinburgh in 1890 and for seven years was master at Loretto School, which had been founded by a distant relative Thomas Langhorne.  John Langhorne died whilst on a visit to Barnard Castle on 27 August 1925 and is buried there. He had been a member of the Association for Teachers in Secondary Schools (Scotland). After his death a bronze tablet was installed in his memory at the school. He was the son of the Reverend John Langhorne and died without issue.

Alumni

 Marion Stevenson, missionary to Africa, and opponent of female genital mutilation.
 James Drummond Young, Lord Drummond Young, judge of the Supreme Courts of Scotland and Chairman of the Scottish Law Commission.

References

Defunct schools in Edinburgh
Educational institutions established in 1762
1762 establishments in Scotland
History of Edinburgh
Charities based in Edinburgh
Educational institutions disestablished in 1975
1975 disestablishments in Scotland